William Paul Forster-Warner, known locally as Will Forster (born 15 August 1986) is a British Liberal Democrat politician, serving since 2009 as councillor for Woking South on Surrey County Council. Since 2011, he has also served as councillor for the Hoe Valley ward (previously Kingfield and Westfield) on Woking Borough Council.

Between 2018 and 2019, Forster served as Mayor of Woking.

Forster was the Liberal Democrat candidate for the constituency of Woking in the 2019 general election, having been selected to contest the previous election in 2017.

Electoral record

General election 2019

General election 2017

References

Living people
Members of Surrey County Council
Liberal Democrats (UK) parliamentary candidates
Liberal Democrats (UK) councillors
People from Woking
1986 births